Taluri-ye Olya (also Romanized as Talūrī-ye ‘Olyā and Telorī-ye ‘Olyā; also known as Talūarī and Talūrī) is a village in Koregah-e Gharbi Rural District, in the Central District of Khorramabad County, Lorestan Province, Iran. At the 2006 census, its population was 1,485, in 292 families.

References 

Towns and villages in Khorramabad County